The Eckerd Open is a defunct WTA Tour affiliated women's tennis tournament founded in 1953 as a combined men's and women's clay court tennis tournament called the Masters Invitational tournament in St Augustine, Florida. In 1954 that event moved to Jacksonville, Florida until 1959. In 1960 the event moved to St Petersburg. It remained at the former location until 1974. After the combined event the St. Petersburg Masters Invitational finished in 1970. The womens event continued under various brand names and various locations in the Tampa Bay Area until it was abolished in 1990.

History
In 1953 Masters Invitational tournament was established at the St Augustine Tennis Club, St Augustine, Florida and played on outdoor clay courts. In 1954 the Masters event was moved to Jacksonville, Florida through till 1959. In 1959 it changed location to St Petersburg, Florida, where it remained under that brand name until 1965. In 1966 the tournaments name was changed to the St. Petersburg Masters Invitational until 1970 when the womens event became known as the Virginia Slims Masters of St Petersburg, the men's tournament continued under the same name until 1971 when it was discontinued. The tournament was part Florida-Caribbean Circuit which was a major feature of the international tennis scene in the 1960s and early 1970s. 

The women's event continued under brand name VS Masters of St Petersburg until 1973 when it was rebranded as the St. Petersburg Masters Invitational In 1974 a new sponsor was found and the event became known as the Barnett Bank Masters until 1974 when it was discontinued. In 1977 the tournament was revived as the Florida Federal Open until 1985, and in 1986 becoming the Eckerd Open until it was abolished. The tournament was played on outdoor clay courts from 1953 to 1974 and from 1987 to 1990. It was played on outdoor hard courts from 1977 to 1986.

The holding of men's tournaments in the Tampa Bay Area were not as consistent as the women's event in 1974 the former St Petersburg Masters Invitational was revived as the St. Petersburg WCT from 1974 to 1975 before that was discontinued. In 1981 a Tampa Open men's tournament held in Tampa, Florida through till 1983.

Locations
Played from 1953 to 1990 in various locations in the Tampa Bay Area, Florida in the United States. St Augustine, Florida from 1953 to 1954, then 
Jacksonville, Florida from 1955 to 1959, then it was held in St. Petersburg, Florida from 1960 to 1974, Palm Harbor, Florida in 1977, in Clearwater, Florida in 1978 and in Tampa, Florida from 1979 to 1990.

Event names
 1953–1965 Masters Invitational
 1966–1970 St Petersburg Masters Invitational
 1971–1972 Virginia Slims Masters of St Petersburg
 1973 St Petersburg Masters Invitational
 1974 Barnett Bank Masters
 1977–1985 Florida Federal Open
 1986–1990 Eckerd Open

Results

Singles

Doubles

See also
 St. Petersburg WCT (for history of the mens tournament)
 Tampa Open – men's tournament (1981–1983) held in Tampa, Florida

References
 WTA Results Archive

 
1971 establishments in Florida
1990 disestablishments in Florida
Clay court tennis tournaments
Eckerd Open
Hard court tennis tournaments in the United States
Recurring sporting events disestablished in 1990
Recurring sporting events established in 1971
Sports in Clearwater, Florida
Sports competitions in St. Petersburg, Florida
Sports competitions in Tampa, Florida
WTA Tour